Edward Sapcote (1489? – 14 December 1547), of Burley, Rutland, was an English politician.

He was the son of MP, Thomas Sapcote.

He was a Member (MP) of the Parliament of England for Rutland in 1539.

References

1489 births
1547 deaths
English MPs 1539–1540
People from Burley, Rutland